The 2012–13 Swiss Cup was the 88th season of Switzerland's annual football cup competition. The competition commenced on 14 September 2012 with the first game of Round 1 and ended on 20 May 2013 with the Final. The winners of the competition, Grasshopper Club Zürich qualified for the play-off round of the 2013–14 UEFA Europa League. They beat defending champions FC Basel in the final.

Participating clubs
All ten Super League and nine Challenge League teams (FC Vaduz are from Liechtenstein and thus play in the 2012–13 Liechtenstein Cup) entered this year's competition, as well as 45 teams from lower leagues. Teams from 1. Liga Promotion and below qualified through separate qualifying rounds within their leagues. Teams from regional leagues qualified by winning the last season's regional cups.

Teams in bold are still active in the competition.

th Title holders.
FP Qualified for having the lowest fair play points inside its regional tier.
† Qualified as regional leagues cup winners before being promoted to 2. Liga Interregional.
‡ Qualified through 2. Liga Interregional qualifiers after being relegated to their regional league.

Round 1
Teams from Super League and Challenge League were seeded in this round. In a match, the home advantage was granted to the team from the lower league, if applicable.

|-
|colspan="3" style="background-color:#99CCCC"|14 September 2012

|-
|colspan="3" style="background-color:#99CCCC"|15 September 2012

|-
|colspan="3" style="background-color:#99CCCC"|16 September 2012

|}

Round 2
The winners of Round 1 played in this round. Teams from Super League were seeded, the home advantage was granted to the team from the lower league, if applicable.

|-
|colspan="3" style="background-color:#99CCCC"|10 November 2012

|-
|colspan="3" style="background-color:#99CCCC"|11 November 2012

|}

Round 3
The winners of Round 2 played in this round, the home advantage was granted to the team from the lower league, if applicable.

|colspan="3" style="background-color:#99CCCC"|8 December 2012

|-
|colspan="3" style="background-color:#99CCCC"|9 December 2012

|-
|colspan="3" style="background-color:#99CCCC"|3 February 2013

|}

Quarter-finals
The winners of Round 3 played in the Quarter-finals, there was no home advantage granted in the draw.

Semi-finals
The winners of the Quarter-finals stage advanced to play in the Semi-finals.

Final
The winners of the Semi-finals stage played in the Final, which was held in the capital.

References

External links
 Official site 
 Official site 

Swiss Cup seasons
Swiss Cup
2012–13 in Swiss football